Harker Canyon or Harkers Canyon is a name of several canyons in the United States:

Harkers Canyon (Salt Lake County, Utah)
Harkers Canyon (Tooele County, Utah)
Harker Canyon (Tooele County, Utah)
Harker Canyon (Washington)